UNS or Uns can mean:

 Unified National Special, part of the Unified Thread Standard
 Unnilseptium (Uns), temporary name of chemical element 107, bohrium (Bh)
 Unified numbering system, used to identify alloys
 Uniform national swing, a system for predicting parliamentary seats
 Universal Numbering System, a dental notation system
 Unión Nacional Sinarquista, a Mexican political movement
 National University of the South, Argentina
 Sebelas Maret University (Universitas Negeri Sebelas Maret), Surakarta, Indonesia
 Uns, a 1983 album by Brazilian singer Caetano Veloso